Jozef Töre (born 18 June 1933) is a Slovak boxer. He competed in the men's lightweight event at the 1960 Summer Olympics.

References

1933 births
Living people
Slovak male boxers
Czechoslovak male boxers
Olympic boxers of Czechoslovakia
Boxers at the 1960 Summer Olympics
People from Fiľakovo
Sportspeople from the Banská Bystrica Region
Lightweight boxers